"Scandalous" (modified to "Scandalous!" for single release) is the eighth track on Prince's soundtrack album Batman and was released as the album's fourth single, five months after the album was released. The music is attributed to Prince and his father, John L. Nelson. A maxi single was released after the single titled The Scandalous Sex Suite, which contained a three-part 19-minute suite of the song "Scandalous", with the three parts named The Crime, The Passion, and The Rapture. Kim Basinger, who was dating Prince at time and who also played the character Vicki Vale in Batman, also appeared on the maxi single.

Music video
The music video features Prince in a red sleeveless outfit doing tricks with the microphone. It ends with him leaving the microphone and holding his arms up.

Critical reception
Music & Media wrote: "The slowest track from Batman is a good enough number but it is a long way from his best".

Track listings
7-inch single (Scandalous!)
"Scandalous!" (edit) – 4:12
"When 2 R in Love" – 3:58

12-inch/CD single (The Scandalous Sex Suite)
"The Crime" – 6:25
"The Passion" – 6:20
"The Rapture" – 6:30
"Sex (The 80's Are Over and the Time Has Come 4 Monogamy and Trust)" – 6:56
"When 2 R in Love" – 3:58
"Partyman" (The Purple Party Mix) – 6:02 (Japan EP bonus track)
"Partyman" (Partyman Music Mix Remix) – 4:31 (Japan EP bonus track)
"Partyman" (The Video Mix) – 6:20 (Japan EP bonus track)
"Feel U Up" (Short Stroke) – 3:42 (Japan EP bonus track)

Charts

References

1989 songs
1989 singles
Prince (musician) songs
Songs written by Prince (musician)
Song recordings produced by Prince (musician)
Warner Records singles
Songs written for films
Batman (1989 film series)
Batman music
1989 debut EPs
Prince (musician) EPs
Albums produced by Prince (musician)
Warner Records EPs